The Aramaic Uruk incantation acquired 1913 by the Louvre, Paris and stored there under AO 6489 is a unique Aramaic text written in Late Babylonian cuneiform syllable signs and dates to the Seleucid period ca. 150 BCE. The finding site is the reš-sanctuary in the ancient city of Uruk (Warka), therefore the label “Uruk”. Particular about this incantation text is that it contains a magical historiola which is divided up into two nearly repetitive successive parts, a text genre that finds its continuation in the Aramaic magical text corpus of Late Antiquity from Iraq and Iran, most prominently in the Mandaic lead rolls and Aramaic incantation bowls. 

The Aramaic language style in which the text is composed is of a literary standard nature and follows a conventional transliteration system of the Aramaic phonemes in cuneiform syllable signs (e.g. <*ḍ> > <q> > Late Aramaic <’>). The text is of importance for the linguistic setting as it is the only Aramaic text example of this period and geographical area (Mesopotamia so far, which shows already the masculine plural ending of the determinative -ē on nouns as in Eastern Aramaic, but lacks certain morphemes as demonstrative pronouns, or the imperfect. The text is set up in a strict literary style and works with typical elements like parallism and chiasmus as already employed in the earlier Babylonian (Akkadian) incantation type, for example in the incantation series Maqlû and Šurpu. There have been manifold discussions and studies concerning the interpretation and translation since the master handcopy by François Thureau-Dangin was published (1922). It is noteworthy that it contains an idiomatic expression in line 2, which already occurs in the Aramaic part of the Book of Ezra ‘a wood shall be pulled out from his house’ 6:11.

Literature 
 Peter C. Jensen, Der Babylonische Beschwörungstext in spätbabylonischer Schrift (Marburg, 1926).
 Godfrey R. Driver, "An Aramaic Inscription in the Cuneiform Script," Archiv für Orientforschung 3, 1926, pp. 47–53.
 P. O. Bostrup, "Aramäische Ritualtexte in Keilschrift," Acta Orientalia V, 1927, pp. 257–305.
 Erich Ebeling (Altorientalist), Ein Beschwörungstext in aramäischer-akkadischer Mischsprache (Berliner Beiträge zur Keilschriftforschung II,2; Berlin, 1935).
 Cyrus H. Gordon, "The Aramaic Incantation in Cuneiform," Archiv für Orientforschung 12, 1938, pp. 105–117.
 Benno Landsberger, "Zu den aramäischen Beschwörungen in Keilschrift," Archiv für Orientforschung 12, 1938, pp. 247–257.
 Franz Rosenthal, "Das Reichsaramäische," in Die aramaistische Forschung seit Theodor Nöldeke’s Veröffentlichungen (Leiden 1939; reprint 1964), pp. 34–35.
 Cyrus H. Gordon, "The Cuneiform Aramaic Incantation," Orientalia NS 9, 1940, pp. 29–38.
 André Dupont-Sommer, "La tablette cunéiforme araméenne de Warka," Revue d’Assyriologie 39, 1942–1944, pp. 35–62.
 Markham J. Geller, "The Aramaic Incantation in Cuneiform Script (AO 6489 = TCL 6,58)," Jaarbericht. Ex Oriente Lux 35-36, 1997–2000, pp. 127–146.
 Christa Müller-Kessler, "Die aramäische Beschwörung und ihre Rezeption in den mandäisch magischen Texten am Beispiel ausgewählter aramäischer Beschwörungsformulare," in Rika Gyselen (ed.), Magie et magiciens, charmes et sortilèges (Res Orientales XIV; Louvain: Peeters, 2002), pp. 195–201 [excellent photography].

Further reading 
 Jan Willem Wesselius, "Notes on Aramaic Magical Texts," Bibliotheca Orientalis 39, 1982, cols. 249–251.
 Karlheinz Kessler, "Das wahre Ende Babylons – Die Tradition der Aramäer, Mandäer, Juden und Manichäer," in Joachim Marzahn and Günther Schauerte (eds.), Babylon. Wahrheit: Eine Ausstellung des Vorderasiatischen Museums Staatliche Museen zu Berlin mit Unterstützung der Staatsbibliothek zu Berlin (München: Hirmer, 2008), pp. 467–486, fig. 336 (excellent photography). 
 Klaus Beyer, Die aramäischen Texte vom Toten Meer, vol. 2 (Göttingen: Vandenhoeck & Ruprecht, 2004), pp. 25–27.

References 

Aramaic languages
Aramaic inscriptions
Cuneiform
Magic (supernatural)
Incantation
Orthography
Near East and Middle East antiquities of the Louvre
2nd century BC in the Seleucid Empire
Uruk